Almopians or Almopes (Ancient Greek: Ἀλμῶπες or Ἀλμωπεῖς) were an ancient Paeonian tribe. They inhabited the region of Almopia in Lower Macedonia, which was named after the tribe. They were expelled after the conquest of the region by Alexander I of Macedon. According to the Greek mythology, the founder of the tribe was thought to be the Giant demigod Almops whom they highly worshiped.

See also
Paeonians

References

Paeonian tribes
Ancient tribes in North Macedonia